Professor Alison Todd  is holder of 18 patents (as at July 2019), and a co-founder and chief scientific officer of SpeeDx. The company manufactures and sells tests for detecting infectious pathogens and identifying antibiotic resistance. The biomedical company, co-founded by Todd, develops diagnostic tools. Todd mentors younger scientists and entrepreneurs, as well as advocating for greater gender diversity in leaders in STEM. ‘Nearly 60 per cent of medical science and health graduates are women, but we hold only 20 per cent of senior leadership positions in the field’.

Career 
Todd is the Chief Scientific Officer of SpeeDx, which is a molecular diagnostics company which she and Elisa Mokany started. Todd and Mokany have 18 patent families between them. They have brought 11 medical diagnostic tests for the management of clinical disease.

Todd developed several novel molecular analytical technologies which have been used for basic research, preclinical/clinical drug development and in vitro diagnostics. Her expertise include nucleic acid chemistry, particularly target amplification and catalytic DNA technologies, and the biology of cancer and viral diseases. Prior to founding SpeeDx, Todd was a Senior Research Director at Johnson and Johnson Research Pty Limited, Sydney.

Todd describes her work,  "We are proud of what we have created because we believe we are making a positive contribution to the welfare of patients around the world. As the old-timer of the pair, I will take the liberty of having the last word and sum up our relationship as a clear case of ‘two heads are better than one’.

Research 
Todd describes her "Eureka moment", "It all began when Elisa joined my group at Johnson & Johnson Research (JJR), we were already exploring ways to exploit DNAzymes (deoxyribozymes) for diagnostic applications. These fascinating molecules are simple, short, synthetic DNA sequences (oligonucleotides) that can catalyse reactions in a manner analogous to protein enzymes. Although catalytic RNA (ribozymes) had been found in nature, catalytic DNA had not, and it had been assumed DNA would not have similar properties. However, a few years earlier, undeterred by dogma, Jerry Joyce and co-workers at Scripps had conducted ‘evolution in a test tube’".

Select publications 
 Santoro, S., and Joyce, G. (1997) A general purpose RNA-cleaving SNA enzyne. Proc. Natl. Acad. Sci. USA 94, 4262-4266.
 Todd, A.V., et al. (2000) DzyNA-PCR: use of DNAzymes to detect and quantify nucleic acid sequences in a real-time fluorescent format Clin. Chem. 46, 625-630.
 Mokany, E., et al. (2010) MNAzymes, a Versatile New Class of Nucleic Acid Enzymes That Can Function as Biosensors and Molecular Switches J. Am. Chem. Soc. 132, 1051-1059.
 Mokany, E., et al. (2013) MNAzyme qPCR with Superior Multiplexing Capacity Clin. Chem. 59, 419-426.

Todd's publications can be found at (Google Scholar).

Awards and recognition 

 Todd was awarded the Johnson & Johnson Philip B. Hofmann Research Scientist Award, an international award recognising outstanding achievement in research and development.
Todd was selected as one of the six Boss True Leaders Game Changers due to her research fighting superbugs.
In 2019 Todd was elected Fellow of the Australian Academy of Technological Sciences and Engineering (FTSE).

Media 
2017 — Todd's work was referenced in The Australian Financial Review, where she was described as a 'frontline fighter in the war on superbugs'.

2017 — An article from Australian Biochemist describes in technical detail, the complexity, yet elegant simplicity that Todd's company uses technology to test infectious diseases.

2017 — The Sydney Morning Herald described the formation of Todd's company, as well as their concern that women were under-represented in STEMM, and the hiring and mentoring practices reflected in their company.

References 

Australian women scientists
Living people
Women biochemists
Australian biochemists
Women inventors
Year of birth missing (living people)
Fellows of the Australian Academy of Technological Sciences and Engineering
21st-century Australian inventors